Federal Highway 187 (Carretera Federal 187) is a Federal Highway of Mexico. The highway travels from El Bellote, Centla Municipality, Tabasco in the north to Raudales Malpaso, Tecpatán Municipality, Chiapas in the south. Federal Highway 187 is one of two major north-south highway corridors in Tabasco (the other being Federal Highway 180 and 195 corridor). Federal Highway 187 route numbering continues as the Federal Highway 187D toll road from Raudales Malpaso south to Mexican Federal Highway 190 east of Ocozocoautla de Espinosa.

References

187